Tunak may refer to:
 Tunak Tunak Tun, a song
 Tunak, Iran, a village in South-Eastern Iran